MOPITT (Measurements of Pollution in the Troposphere) is a payload scientific instrument launched into Earth orbit by NASA on board the Terra satellite in 1999. It is designed to monitor changes in pollution patterns and its effect in the lower atmosphere of the Earth. The instrument was funded by the Space Science Division of the Canadian Space Agency.

Instrument

MOPITT is a nadir sounding (vertically downward pointing) instrument that measures upwelling infrared radiation at 4.7 μm and 2.2-2.4 μm. It uses correlation spectroscopy to calculate total column observations and profiles of carbon monoxide in the lower atmosphere. Although observations of methane were also planned, to date no data have been released.

References

External links
Official website for MOPITT science and product development team
MOPITT instrument website at the University of Toronto
NASA WIST data archive system
MOPITT data available through NASA-Langley

Atmospheric sounding satellite sensors